James William Forster (1784 - 1861), a graduate of Trinity College, Dublin, was Archdeacon of Aghadoe from 1834 and Vicar general of the Diocese of Limerick, Ardfert and Aghadoe until his death on 28 May 1861.

References

Alumni of Trinity College Dublin
Archdeacons of Aghadoe
1861 deaths
1784 births